"No Secrets" is a song by Australian hard rock group, the Angels, released in April 1980 from their fourth studio album, Dark Room. "No Secrets" peaked at number 8 on the Kent Music Report Singles Chart. It was co-written by band members, Graham "Buzz" Bidstrup and Bernard "Doc" Neeson. In January 2018, as part of Triple M's "Ozzest 100", the most Australian songs of all time, "No Secrets" was ranked number 50.

Background 

Australian hard rock group, the Angels, released the single "No Secrets" in April 1980 ahead of their fourth studio album, Dark Room (June) via Epic Records. The album was produced by band members John Brewster (also on rhythm guitar and backing vocals) and Richard Brewster (also on lead guitar, piano and organ) with the rest of the line-up of Doc Neeson on lead vocals, Chris Bailey on bass guitar and backing vocals and Graham "Buzz" Bidstrup on drums. "No Secrets" was co-written by Bidstrup and Neeson. It peaked at number 8 on the Kent Music Report singles chart. In January 2018, as part of Triple M's "Ozzest 100", the most Australian songs of all time, "No Secrets" was ranked number 50.

Track listing

Epic Records ES 417
 "No Secrets" (Graham Bidstrup, Doc Neeson) - 4:17
 "Staring Voices" (Doc Neeson, John Brewster, Rick Brewster, Graham Buzz" Bidstrup) -  2:39

Personnel

 Doc Neeson - lead vocals
 Rick Brewster - lead guitar
 John Brewster - rhythm guitar
 Chris Bailey - bass guitar
 Graham "Buzz" Bidstrup - drums

Charts

Weekly charts

Year-end charts

References

The Angels (Australian band) songs
1980 songs
1980 singles
Songs written by Graham Bidstrup
Songs written by Doc Neeson
Epic Records singles